Salavat Askhatovich Galeyev (born 13 October 1958) is a Russian professional football coach and a former player. He is an assistant manager with FC Khimik Dzerzhinsk.

External links
 

1958 births
People from Dzerzhinsk, Russia
Living people
Soviet footballers
Russian footballers
Russian football managers
Association football defenders
FC Spartak Moscow players
FC Khimik Dzerzhinsk players
FC Torpedo NN Nizhny Novgorod players
Sportspeople from Nizhny Novgorod Oblast